A product requirements document (PRD) is a document containing all the requirements for a certain product.
It is written to allow people to understand what a product should do. A PRD should, however, generally avoid anticipating or defining how the product will do it in order to later allow interface designers and engineers to use their expertise to provide the optimal solution to the requirements.

PRDs are most frequently written for software products, but can be used for any type of product and also for services. 
Typically, a PRD is created from a user's point-of-view by a user/client or a company's marketing department (in the latter case it may also be called Marketing Requirements Document (MRD)). The requirements are then analyzed by a (potential) maker/supplier from a more technical point of view, broken down and detailed in a Functional Specification (sometimes also called Technical Requirements Document).

Components
Typical components of a product requirements document (PRD) are:

 Title & author information
 Purpose and scope, from both a technical and business perspective
 Stakeholder identification
 Market assessment and target demographics
 Product overview and use cases
 Requirements, including
 functional requirements (e.g. what a product should do)
 usability requirements
 technical requirements (e.g. security, network, platform, integration, client)
 environmental requirements
 support requirements
 interaction requirements (e.g. how the product should work with other systems)
 Assumptions 
 Constraints
 Dependencies
 High level workflow plans, timelines and milestones (more detail is defined through a project plan)
 Evaluation plan and performance metrics

Not all PRDs have all of these components. In particular, PRDs for other types of products (manufactured goods, etc.) will eliminate the software-specific elements from the list above, and may add in additional elements that pertain to their domain, e.g. manufacturing requirements.

See also 
 Marketing requirements document
 Product planning
 Product design
 Product management
 Requirements
 Requirements management
 User requirements document

References

 Product Management 
 Translation and Localization Project Management 
 Project Management ToolBox 
 The Digital Guide To Software Development 
 The Product Manager's Toolkit
 Difference between requirement documents
Product management
Software requirements